Gilla na Naemh Ua Dunabhra (died 1101) was Chief Poet of Connacht, Ireland.

The Annals of the Four Masters state, sub anno 1101, that "Gilla-na-naemh Ua Dunabhra, chief poet of Connacht, died."

The previous chief poet of the kingdom, In Druí Ua Carthaigh, had died in 1097.

No known surviving poems are ascribed to Ua Dunabhra. His origins are uncertain.

References

 http://www.ucc.ie/celt/published/T100005B/
 http://www.irishtimes.com/ancestor/surname/index.cfm?fuseaction=Go.&UserID=

11th-century Irish writers
1101 deaths
Medieval Irish poets
Year of birth unknown
Irish male poets
Irish-language writers